The 2022 Madrid Open (sponsored by Mutua) was a professional tennis tournament played on outdoor clay courts at the Park Manzanares in Madrid, Spain from 28 April to 8 May 2022. It was the 20th edition of the event on the ATP Tour and 13th on the WTA Tour. It was classified as an ATP Tour Masters 1000 event on the 2022 ATP Tour and a WTA 1000 event on the 2022 WTA Tour.

Champions

Men's singles 

  Carlos Alcaraz def.  Alexander Zverev, 6–3, 6–1

Women's singles 

  Ons Jabeur def.  Jessica Pegula, 7–5, 0–6, 6–2
This was Jabeur's second WTA Tour title, and first at WTA 1000 level.

Men's doubles 

  Wesley Koolhof /  Neal Skupski def.  Juan Sebastián Cabal /  Robert Farah, 6–7(4–7), 6–4, [10–5]

This was the first career ATP Masters 1000 title for both players.

Women's doubles 

  Gabriela Dabrowski /  Giuliana Olmos def.  Desirae Krawczyk /  Demi Schuurs, 7–6(7–1), 5–7, [10–7]

Points and Prize Money

Point distribution

Prize money

*per team

References

External links

 Official website
 (ATP) tournament profile